The 2013–14 ISU Grand Prix of Figure Skating was a series of senior international figure skating competitions in the 2013–14 season. Medals were awarded in the disciplines of men's singles, ladies' singles, pair skating, and ice dancing. Skaters earned points based on their placement at each event and the top six in each discipline qualified to compete at the Grand Prix Final, held in Fukuoka, Japan.

Organized by the International Skating Union, the Grand Prix series began October 18 and continued until December 8, 2013. Skaters competed for medals, prize money, and a chance to compete in the Grand Prix Final. The series set the stage for the 2014 European, Four Continents, the World Championships, as well as the 2014 Winter Olympics and each country's national championships.

The corresponding series for junior-level skaters was the 2013–14 ISU Junior Grand Prix.

Schedule
The ISU announced the following schedule of events taking place in autumn 2013:

General requirements 
Skaters who reached the age of 14 by July 1, 2013 were eligible to compete on the senior Grand Prix circuit. Prior to competing in a Grand Prix event, skaters were required to have earned the following scores:

Assignments
The International Skating Union released the initial list of Grand Prix assignments on June 3, 2013:

Men

Ladies

Pairs

Ice dance

Changes to preliminary assignments

Skate America
 Evan Lysacek withdrew and was replaced by Jason Brown.
 Vanessa James / Morgan Cipres withdrew and were replaced by Margaret Purdy / Michael Marinaro.
 Brian Joubert withdrew. No replacement was made.
 Denis Ten withdrew due to illness. No replacement was made.

Skate Canada International
 Yuna Kim and Kiira Korpi withdrew. They were replaced by Courtney Hicks and Natalia Popova.
 Yuko Kavaguti / Alexander Smirnov withdrew due to an injury to Smirnov. They were replaced by Haven Denney / Brandon Frazier.
 Alena Leonova withdrew due to a leg injury. No replacement was made.

Cup of China
 Polina Korobeynikova withdrew and was replaced by Nikol Gosviani. 
 Geng Bingwa withdrew and was replaced by Guo Xiaowen.
 Kevin Reynolds withdrew. No replacement was made.

NHK Trophy
 Yuko Kavaguti / Alexander Smirnov withdrew due to an injury to Smirnov. Anastasia Martiusheva / Alexei Rogonov were named to replace them.
 Li Zijun withdrew. No replacement was made.
 Chafik Besseghier withdrew. No replacement was made.

Trophée Éric Bompard
 Yuna Kim and Kiira Korpi withdrew. They were replaced by Amelie Lacoste and Natalia Popova. 
 Ross Miner withdrew. No replacement was made.
 Chafik Besseghier and Romain Ponsart withdrew. 
 Annabelle Prolss / Ruben Blommaert replaced Daria Popova / Bruno Massot.

Rostelecom Cup
 Artur Gachinski, Nikol Gosviani, Ksenia Monko / Kirill Khaliavin, and Ksenia Stolbova / Fedor Klimov were selected later as host picks. 
 Kevin Reynolds withdrew. He was replaced by Misha Ge.
 On 13 November, it was announced that Evgeni Plushenko had withdrawn due to injury. He was replaced by Konstantin Menshov.
 Brian Joubert withdrew. No replacement was made.
 Kaetlyn Osmond withdrew. No replacement was made.
 Britney Simpson / Matthew Blackmer withdrew and were replaced by Lindsay Davis / Rockne Brubaker.

Medal summary

Qualification 
At each event, skaters earned points toward qualification for the Grand Prix Final. Following the sixth event, the top six highest scoring skaters/teams advanced to the Final. The points earned per placement were as follows:

There were seven tie-breakers in cases of a tie in overall points:
	Highest placement at an event. If a skater placed 1st and 3rd, the tiebreaker is the 1st place, and that beats a skater who placed 2nd in both events.
	Highest combined total scores in both events. If a skater earned 200 points at one event and 250 at a second, that skater would win in the second tie-break over a skater who earned 200 points at one event and 150 at another.
	Participated in two events.
	Highest combined scores in the free skating/free dancing portion of both events.
	Highest individual score in the free skating/free dancing portion from one event.
	Highest combined scores in the short program/short dance of both events.
	Highest number of total participants at the events.

If a tie remained, it was considered unbreakable and the tied skaters all advanced to the Grand Prix Final.

Qualification standings
Bold denotes Grand Prix Final qualification.

Medal standings

References 

Isu Grand Prix Of Figure Skating, 2013-14
ISU Grand Prix of Figure Skating